Now, More Than Ever (stylized as now, more than ever) is an EP by American hip hop group Flatbush Zombies. It was released on June 5, 2020 under the Glorious Dead label.

Chart performance
Now, More Than Ever debuted at number 168 on the US Billboard 200 chart.

Track listing

Charts

References

2020 debut EPs
Flatbush Zombies albums